Parole in circolo (English: "Words in circle") is the third studio album by Italian singer-songwriter Marco Mengoni, released by Sony Music Italy on 13 January 2015. Three singles were released in promotion of the album: "Guerriero" in November 2014, "Esseri umani" in February 2015 and "Io ti aspetto" in May 2015. The album is the first of a two albums project (with Le cose che non ho). Mengoni also recorded a Spanish version of the album titled Liberando Palabras.

Track listing

Personnel
Marco Mengoni — Vocals, Choirs

Additional personnel
Tim Pierce — Guitar
Alessandro de Crescenzo — Guitar
Sean Hurley — Bass guitar 
Giovanni Pallotti — Bass guitar
Jeff Babko — Piano, Hammond organ, Fender Rhodes
Michele Canova Iorfida — Keyboards, Programming
Christian "Noochie" Rigano — Keyboards, Synthesizer, Programming
Blair Sinta — Drums
Marco Tamburini — Trumpet
Roberto Rossi — Trombone

Charts

Certifications

References

Marco Mengoni albums
2015 albums
Italian-language albums
Albums produced by Michele Canova